Plate Cove East is a small community located in Bonavista Bay, Newfoundland and Labrador. It is part of the federal electoral riding of Bonavista—Gander—Grand Falls—Windsor. It was officially a town from 1960 until 2004. In 1966 it had a population of 237. In 2011 there were 89 inhabitants.

The town has a primarily Catholic population with some Anglicans. Some of the industries in the community include fishing and farming. There is a fishery nearby in Plate Cove West.

This little village has a large number of families named Philpott, or Philpot. A common family name found in Plate Cove West, Newfoundland and Labrador is Keough. The Keoughs are distant relatives of the Philpotts. There are also a number of Dooleys, Russells and Murphys.

Plate Cove East is also the repository of a number of unique folk songs. Many of these songs were collected in the 1970s. A come home year was set for July 2012.

See also
 List of communities in Newfoundland and Labrador

References

Former towns in Newfoundland and Labrador
Populated coastal places in Canada
Populated places in Newfoundland and Labrador